The Anniversary Award is a traveling trophy awarded to the winner of the annual college football game between the Bowling Green Falcons of Bowling Green State University and the Kent State Golden Flashes of Kent State University. Both schools, founded together in 1910, are located in northern Ohio, with Bowling Green in Northwest Ohio and Kent State in Northeast Ohio. The series between the two began in 1920, the first year Kent State fielded a football team, while the trophy was introduced in 1985.

History
The Anniversary Award was created by each of the schools' alumni departments and commemorates the founding of both institutions, which occurred in 1910 as a result of the Lowry Bill. The award was first given out in 1985 to celebrate the 75th anniversary of the founding of each school. The rivalry has overall been lop-sided, with Bowling Green winning 25 of the 34 meetings.

Game results

See also  
 List of NCAA college football rivalry games

References

College football rivalry trophies in the United States
Bowling Green Falcons football
Kent State Golden Flashes football
Recurring sporting events established in 1985
1985 establishments in Ohio
College football rivalries in the United States